The 2011 Moscow Victory Day Parade was an event held on 9 May 2011 to commemorate the 66th anniversary of the capitulation of Nazi Germany in 1945. The parade marked the Soviet Union's victory in the Great Patriotic War. 20,000 soldiers and officers representing all three services of the Armed Forces of the Russian Federation, the Ministry of Internal Affairs, the Federal Security Service, and the Ministry of Emergency Situations took part in the parade, followed by +100 military vehicles and 5 Mil Mi-8 Hip helicopters.

Minister of Defence Anatoly Serdyukov was the parade inspector while Colonel General Valery Gerasimov, the then Deputy Chief of the General Staff was the parade commander. For the first time, the new battledress duty uniforms were worn by almost all the parading units. A year later, due to the massive unpopularity of the uniforms, it was reverted to the old style.

Gallery

References

External links 

Dress rehearsals of military parade dedicated to the great victory
Blok Ülkelerin 9 Mayıs Zafer Günü(Foto)
YouTube video clip of the parade, 1 hour, 3 minutes in length

Moscow Victory Day Parades
Moscow Victory Day Parade
2011 in military history
2011 in Moscow
May 2011 events in Russia